The Washington Wild Things are a professional baseball team based in Washington, Pennsylvania, in the United States. The Wild Things are a member of the Frontier League, an independent baseball league which, as of 2020, is an official Partner League of Major League Baseball. From the 2002 season to the present, the Wild Things have played their home games at Wild Things Park.

Seasons

Current Roster

Highlights
 First ever perfect game in Frontier League history, (Matt Sergey, August 24, 2014)
 Frontier League Organization of the Year Award (2002, 2004, 2005)
 Second team in Frontier League history to make playoffs four straight years (Evansville, 1997–2000)
 Led Frontier League in wins four straight seasons
 2002 (56–28)
 2003 (54–34)
 2004 (62–34)
 2005 (63–32)
 In 2005:
 35–12 second half of season (Since July 18)
 23–5 the month of August
 13-game winning streak (July 27 – August 9)
 11-game winning streak (August 12 – August 23)
 14 straight home wins (August 3 – August 23)
 Hosted the Frontier League All-Star Game in 2005 and 2013

New Frontier League records up to 2005
 Only perfect game in Frontier League history (August 24, 2014, thrown by Matt Sergey)
 Wins in a season: 63 (old record – Washington Wild Things, 2004)
 Triples: 46 (old record – 33; Springfield, 1999)
 Runs: 645 (old record – 612; London, 1999)
 At Bats: 3,357 (old record – 3329; Rockford, 2004)
 Hits: 999 (old record – 962; Rockford, 2004)
 RBI: 567 (old record – 550; London, 1999)
 Base on Balls: 433 (old record – 427; Dubois County, 2002)
 Saves: 34 (old record – Washington Wild Things, 2004)
 Total chances: 3740 (old record – 3,687; S/O 2004)
 Individual saves by a closer, Jonathan Kountis

Managers
 2002–2003: Jeff Isom (110–62)
 2004–2007: John Massarelli (239–143)
 2008: Greg Jelks (48–48)
 2009: Mark Mason (43–53)
 2010–2011: Darin Everson (80–110)
 2012: Chris Bando (44–52)
 2013–2014: Bart Zeller (72–74)
 2014: Bob Bozzuto: (36–18)

Following the 2003 season, Jeff Isom resigned as manager and moved to the Joliet Jackhammers of the Northern League. After the 2007 season, Massarelli and the Wild Things parted ways. He took 2008 off and was named the first manager in Lake Erie Crushers history. In 2008, Greg Jelks was named the new manager of the Wild Things, but failed to lead them to the playoffs and finished the season at 48–48.

Mark Mason returned to the Wild Things in 2009 as manager after coaching the Paints for two seasons. In November 2009, Mason left the Wild Things to become pitching coach of the Atlantic League's York Revolution. On February 16, 2010, they announced Darin Everson as their new manager. After the 2011 season, Darin Everson and the Wild Things parted ways following an 80–110 record over two seasons. On October 18, 2011, the Wild Things hired former MLB catcher and Triple-A coach Chris Bando as the 6th manager in Wild things history. In March 2013, Bando announced that due to complications from hip surgery in January he would resign as manager. Recently hired Bench coach Bart Zeller, who had managed the Joliet Slammers the last two seasons and won a championship, was promoted to manager. During the 2014 season at 31–19 headed into the All-Star break, manager Bart Zeller resigned due to health concerns. He was scheduled to manage the Eastern All-Stars. After the break, Bob Bozzuto took over as manager.

Notable alumni
 Kalen DeBoer (1998)
 Vidal Nuño (2011)
 Chris Smith (2011–2012)
 Zac Grotz (2016)
 Pat McAfee  (2018)
 Rob Whalen (2021–2022)
 Isaac Mattson (2022)

Championships and awards
 2002 Frontier League Eastern Division Champions
 2002 Frontier League Organization of the Year
 2002 Jared Howton, Most Valuable Pitcher
 2002 Jeff Isom, Manager Of the Year
 2003 Josh Loggins, Most Valuable Player
 2004 Frontier League Eastern Division Champions
 2004 Frontier League Organization of the Year
 2004 John Massarelli, Manager Of the Year
 2005 Frontier League Eastern Division Champions
 2005 Frontier League Organization of the Year
 2006 Frontier League Eastern Division Champions
 2006 John Massarelli, Manager Of the Year
 2007 Frontier League Eastern Division Champions
 2018 Frontier League Eastern Division Champions
 2021 Frontier League Eastern Division Champions
 2022 Frontier League West Division  Champions

References

External links 

 

Frontier League teams
Professional baseball teams in Pennsylvania
Washington, Pennsylvania